Langtrees is Australia's largest bordello, with premises in Perth, Kalgoorlie, Canberra and Darwin.

Langtrees is owned by Mary-Anne Kenworthy Australia's most well known madam.

Langtrees Perth
Located at 71 Burswood Road, Burswood is Perth's largest bordello. Featuring 19 themed rooms and can have up to 30 ladies working.

May 2002 - Langtrees closes its door as US sailors wear out sex workers

July 2011 - Langtrees was targeted by bandits Two men smashed through the front door of Langtrees in Burswood at about 12.30am and demanded money from the till.

Owner Mary-Anne Kenworthy said the venue's two receptionists were left “panicky” and “scared” by the incident.

Langtrees Canberra
Upmarket luxury Canberra bordello. Located at 32 Grimwade Street in Mitchell, Kenworthy purchased this establishment in 2014. Langtrees Canberra is the only licensed bar & bordello in Australia

Langtrees Kalgoorlie
Recently transformed from a working bordello museum, to restaurant. In 2000 when Langtrees Kalgoorlie opened it was one of the only working brothel museums in the world.

January 2007 - Kalgoorlie's notorious Hay st brothel strip has turned to tourism in a bid to keep it alive offering tours 

July 2019 -  'It's time': End of an era as brothel madam puts historic Kalgoorlie bordello on the market.

Darwin Escorts By Langtrees 
December 2016 Darwin Escorts was bought out by Langtrees, and is now known as Langtrees VIP Darwin (The Chillout Lounge). It is now closed.

Langtrees Fyshwick
In January 2019 Langtrees expanded to the south of Canberra, opening an establishment in the sex area of Fyshwick. NOW RELOCATED TO MITCHELL

See also
Prostitution in Australia

References

External links
 
 Langtrees VIP Canberra

Sex industry in Australia
1975 establishments in Australia
Brothels in Australia